Étienne Pasquier (7 June 15291 September 1615) was a French lawyer and man of letters.  By his own account he was born in Paris on 7 June 1529, but according to others he was born in 1528. He was called to the Paris bar in 1549.

In 1558 he became very ill by eating poisonous mushrooms and took two years to recover. This compelled him to occupy himself with literary work and in 1560 he published the first book of his Recherches de la France. In 1565, when he was thirty-seven he became famous after giving a speech in which he pleaded the cause of the University of Paris against the Jesuits and won it. Meanwhile, he pursued the Recherches steadily and published other miscellaneous work from time to time.

These Grands Jours (an institution which fell into desuetude at the end of the 17th century, with bad effects on the social and political welfare of the French provinces) were a kind of irregular assize in which a commission of the parlement of Paris, selected and dispatched at short notice by the king, had full power to hear and determine all causes, especially those in which seignorial rights had been abused. At the Grands Jours of Poitiers of the date mentioned and at those of Troyes in 1583, Pasquier officiated; and each occasion has left a curious literary memorial of the jests with which he and his colleagues relieved their graver duties. The Poitiers work was the celebrated collection of poems on flea (La Puce de Madame Des Roches, published 1583; see Catherine Des Roches).

In 1585 Pasquier was appointed by Henry III advocate-general at the Paris cours des comptes, an important body having political as well as financial and legal functions. Here he distinguished himself particularly by opposing, sometimes successfully, the system of selling hereditary places and offices. The civil wars forced Pasquier to leave Paris and for some years he lived in Tours, working steadily on his great book, but he returned to Paris in Henry IV's train in March 1594. He continued until 1604 with his work on the chambre des comptes; then he retired. He lived more than ten years in retirement, producing much literary work and died after a few hours' illness on 1 September 1615.

In so long and so laborious a life, Pasquier's work was substantial but has never been fully collected or printed. The standard edition is that of Amsterdam (2 vols. fol., 1723). But for ordinary readers the selections of Leon Feugbre, published in Paris (2 vols. 8vo, 1849), with an elaborate introduction, are most accessible. As a poet Pasquier is chiefly interesting as a minor member of the Pléiade movement. As a prose writer he is much more accomplished. The three chief divisions of his prose work are his Recherches, his letters and his professional speeches. The letters are of much biographical interest and historical importance and the Recherches contain in a somewhat miscellaneous fashion invaluable information on a vast variety of subjects, literary, political, antiquarian and others.

Recherches de la France

Pasquier's historical work is seen as an important predecessor to modern historiography, although he is indebted to the methods of other important Italian historians.  He makes frequent use of primary sources (or contemporary chroniclers) and cites them as he goes along.  Contrary to many other historical works of the time, Pasquier sought to create an accurate reconstruction of the past for the present needs of France, which he held to be in a period of crisis.

He looked to define France in terms of its customs and culture and wrote a distinctly national history. He began his story not with the origins of human civilization but with the origins of France in the Gauls.  While he lamented his lack of sources on the subject, he tried to extract what he could from things such as Caesar's writings on Gaul.

Pasquier attempted to contrast France with Rome and believed that the history of France is as great as the history of Rome, criticizing the widespread use of Latin, Roman law, etc.  Instead, he had great respect for French literature and institutions without glorifying the history of France and its kings in the way of previous chroniclers.

See also 

 Journal d'un bourgeois de Paris

References

Sources
Huppert, George, The Idea of Perfect History: Historical Erudition and Historical Philosophy in Renaissance France.  (Urbana: University of Illinois Press, 1970) - See the chapter on Pasquier p28-71.

External links
Plaidoyé de l’Vniuersité de Paris, encontre les Iesuites, pronounced in 1565, and published in the IIIrd book of the Recherches de la France (1621).

Writers from Paris
1529 births
1615 deaths
16th-century French lawyers
16th-century French historians
16th-century French poets
French Roman Catholics
French male non-fiction writers